The governor of Pangasinan is the highest political office in the province of Pangasinan, Philippines. Along with the Governor of Ilocos Norte, Ilocos Sur and La Union, he sits in the Regional Development Council of Ilocos Region.

List of governors of Pangasinan

References

Governors of provinces of the Philippines